Yair Elazar Glotman (born 1987) is a composer and musician based in Berlin.

He releases his own music and composes film scores, most recently A24's "False Positive" (co-composed with Lucy Railton) and Johann Johannsson’s film Last and First Men (co-composed with Jóhann Jóhannsson). In addition, he collaborates and contributes double bass recordings for other composers, including Hildur Guðnadóttir, Ben Frost and Geoff Barrow. His musical output within these various mediums and collaborations is strongly anchored in his training as an orchestral double bass player and in electroacoustic composition. His practice employs a range of improvisation, extended double bass techniques, and a special interest in textural, spatial and spectral compositions and combining analog and digital processing.

Early life 
Glotman was born in Tel Aviv, Israel. He started his musical education at the age of eight, initially on the classical guitar and bass guitar. He later took up the double bass and received both jazz and classical music training. Between 2006-2008 he studied at the Jerusalem Academy of Music, then moved to Berlin to study orchestral double bass at the Berlin University of the Arts under Prof. Michael Wolf. He later expanded his studies to include electroacoustic composition as well as media and sound art under Prof. Dr. phil. Alberto de Campo. He completed his Meisterschule degree in 2015.

Musical career 
In recent years, Glotman has been increasingly composing for film and media, all the while continuing to release music under his own name and in collaboration with other composers.

Film and TV score work 
Glotman’s work for film has included co-composing False Positive with Lucy Railton, an A24 production written by Ilana Glazer and John Lee. In 2018, he began collaborating with the influential, late composer Jóhann Jóhannsson on his directorial debut Last and First Men, developing the film score and recording for him. Glotman also worked with him as additional music composer for Mandy (2018) and recorded for other projects. After his passing, he was tasked with co-composing and producing the score of Last and First Men. The film premiered at the 70th Berlin International Film Festival in February 2020, and the soundtrack album was released by Deutsche Grammophon. In addition, he has worked with and contributed to scores by composers such as Hildur Guðnadóttir, Ben Frost, Geoff Barrow and Ben Salisbury, Dustin O'Halloran and Hauschka.

Solo Work 

Under his own name, Glotman has released music that is directly tied to his training and relationship with the double bass. Études (2015) was an attempt at disrupting the learned habits of playing a classical instrument and exploring hidden resonances, physical vibrations, and the outer edges of the instrument's acoustic dynamic range. Compound (2017) expands these experiments to a trio, adding pianist Rieko Okuda and percussionist Marcello Silvio Busato into the musical conversation.

Glotman’s solo projects include KETEV, a dark techno / Ambient project under which he released albums on the labels Opal Tapes, Where To Now? and Portals Editions. In addition, he has released under Blessed Initiative, an Electroacoustic project on the label Subtext.

Collaborations 
Glotman has worked closely with musical collaborators. Together with Swedish composer Mats Erlandsson he has released two albums, and with Icelandic violinist and composer Viktor Orri Árnason he has released an album on the Icelandic Label Bedroom Community.

Discography

Filmography

Awards and nominations

External links 
 Official website
 
 Yair Elazar Glotman discography on Discogs 
 Yair Elazar Glotman on AllMusic 
 Artist Page on the label 130701
Yair Elazar Glotman Interview for Deutsche Grammophone about Last and First Men
 Last and First Men on the Label Deutsche Grammophone
Pitchfork review on Glotman's album 'Blessed Initiative' 
The Quietus review on Glotman's album 'I Know No Weekend'

References 

Double-bassists
Musicians from Berlin
Israeli composers
Experimental musicians
Male film score composers
1987 births
Living people